11 Persei is a single star in the constellation of Perseus, located about 418 light years away from the Sun. It is visible to the naked eye as a dim, blue-white hued star with an apparent visual magnitude of 5.76.

This is a chemically peculiar mercury-manganese star. It has a low rotation rate, showing a projected rotational velocity of 4.50 km/s. The star has 3.8 times the mass of the Sun and is radiating 210 times the Sun's luminosity from its photosphere at an effective temperature of 14,550 K.

References

B-type main-sequence stars
Mercury-manganese stars
Perseus (constellation)
Durchmusterung objects
Persei, 11
016727
012692
0785